Luis Fernando Hernández Betancourt (born 1 August 1998) is a Mexican professional footballer who plays as a midfielder for Liga de Expansión MX club Zacatecas.

References

External links
 at  Liga MX 
 
 

Living people
1998 births
Association football midfielders
Mineros de Zacatecas players
Ascenso MX players
Liga de Expansión MX players
Liga Premier de México players
Tercera División de México players
Footballers from Jalisco
Mexican footballers